Kolarić or Kolarič is a gender-neutral Slavic surname that may refer to

Jana Kolarič (born 1954), Slovene author and translator
Nina Kolarič (born 1986), Slovenian long jumper
Pajo Kolarić (1821–1876), Croatian composer 
Zlata Kolarić-Kišur (1894–1990), Croatian writer